Prionoxystus macmurtrei, the little carpenterworm moth, is a moth of the family Cossidae. It is found from Ontario and Quebec to Florida, west to Texas, north to Minnesota.

The wingspan is 45–75 mm. Adults are on wing from April to July.

The larvae feed on ash, maple and oak. The species is considered a pest, because the tunnels the larvae create decrease the value of hardwood lumber.

References

External links
Bug Guide

Cossinae